Saatluy Kuh (also Romanized as Sā‘atlūy Kūh; also known as Sā‘atlū Kūh, Sā‘atlūy Dāgh, Sā‘atlū-ye Dāgh, Sā‘atlū-ye Kūh, and Sā‘tlū) is a village in Baranduz Rural District, in the Central District of Urmia County, West Azerbaijan Province, Iran. At the 2006 census, its population was 328, in 72 families.

References 

Populated places in Urmia County